Hurricane Camille was the second most intense tropical cyclone on record to strike the United States (behind the 1935 Labor Day hurricane) and is one of just four Category 5 hurricanes to make landfall in the U.S.

The most intense storm of the 1969 Atlantic hurricane season, Camille originated as a tropical depression on August 14, south of Cuba, from a long-tracked tropical wave. Located in a favorable environment for strengthening, the storm quickly intensified into a Category 2 hurricane before striking the western part of Cuba on August 15. Emerging into the Gulf of Mexico, Camille underwent another period of rapid intensification and became a Category 5 hurricane the next day as it moved northward towards Louisiana and Mississippi. Despite weakening slightly on August 17, the hurricane quickly re-intensified back into a Category 5 hurricane before it made landfall a half hour before midnight in Bay St. Louis, Mississippi. As Camille pushed inland, it quickly weakened and was a tropical depression by the time it was over the Ohio Valley. Once it emerged offshore, Camille was able to restrengthen to a strong tropical storm before becoming extratropical on August 22. Camille was absorbed by a frontal storm over the North Atlantic later that day.

It flattened nearly everything along the Mississippi coast and caused additional flooding and deaths inland while crossing the Appalachian Mountains of Virginia. In the U.S., Camille killed more than 259 people and caused $1.42 billion in damages (equivalent to $ in ).

Meteorological history

Hurricane Camille originated from a tropical wave that moved off the western coast of Africa on August 5, 1969. It tracked quickly westward along the 15th parallel north; several days later, a tropical disturbance became clearly identifiable on satellite imagery on August 9. By that time, the thunderstorm activity in the disturbance concentrated into a circular area of convection. On the next day, the storm moved through the Lesser Antilles, although there was no evidence of a closed circulation. On August 13, the wave passed near or over the southern coast of Jamaica as its convection spread northeastward through the Bahamas. Subsequently, it began a slower motion to the northwest. It is believed that the tropical wave organized into a tropical depression shortly thereafter, early on August 14, and it became a tropical storm a few hours later. On the morning of August 14, the Hurricane Hunters flew to investigate for a closed circulation near the Bahamas and near the Cayman Islands. The crew observed a developing center in the western Caribbean, and winds had reached tropical storm status.

Upon first being classified as a tropical storm, Camille was located in an area favorable for further strengthening, although initially it slowly intensified. It was located within an area of very light wind shear and an overall warm environment. Additionally, the storm developed strong low-level inflow from the deep southern Caribbean, which continuously brought moisture into the storm. Throughout its duration, it was a small tropical cyclone, although with a radius of gale-force winds spreading  to the north, the storm's thunderstorm area quickly spread over Cuba. Prior to landfall, its eye was tracked by radar from Havana; it is estimated the hurricane moved ashore between Cape San Antonio and Guane late on August 15 as a strong Category 2 hurricane.

Initially, Hurricane Camille was forecast to turn northeastward toward the Florida panhandle. Instead, it continued northwestward and resumed its rapid intensification trend after leaving Cuba. At the time, it was not expected to intensify further. However, a subsequent Hurricane Hunters flight early on August 17 recorded a slightly deeper central pressure of 905 mbar (hPa; 26.73 inHg), at the time the lowest pressure recorded by reconnaissance aircraft. That made Camille the most intense hurricane since the 1935 Labor Day hurricane; currently it is the sixth-most intense Atlantic hurricane, as ranked by lowest pressure. There was little change in the wind speed as such levelled out at  during that time.

As it continued toward the Gulf Coast of the United States, Camille maintained its small eye, and forecasters continued to anticipate a turn toward Florida. Late on August 17, Camille briefly weakened to a Category 4 storm due to an eyewall replacement cycle; a reconnaissance flight was forced to end its mission early due to a damaged engine. There were no subsequent Hurricane Hunter flights, but surface observations recorded later suggested that Camille quickly re-strengthened and regained Category 5 intensity. After passing very close to southeastern Louisiana, Hurricane Camille made landfall at 11:30 CDT in Bay St. Louis, Mississippi.

The hurricane weakened as it progressed inland, and within 14 hours of moving ashore, Camille weakened to tropical storm status. About 12 hours later, it weakened to tropical depression status, by which time it began a turn to the north and northeast. On August 20, Tropical Depression Camille turned eastward through Kentucky, dropping heavy rainfall in West Virginia and Virginia. Later that day, it emerged into the Atlantic Ocean east of Norfolk, and by that afternoon, as Camille was emerging offshore it regained tropical storm status. Subsequently, Camille began to interact with a frontal storm, causing it to gradually transition into an extratropical cyclone as it entrained cooler air. On August 22, Camille was absorbed by the frontal system to the south of Atlantic Canada.

Preparations

Shortly after Camille formed, the National Hurricane Center advised residents on the Isle of Pines and in western Cuba to prepare for gale-force winds, heavy rains, and rising tides. The agency also recommended small boats to remain in harbor. The threat of the storm prompted officials to evacuate thousands along the western coast of Cuba and on the Isle of Pines; on the island, 10,000 cattle and 6,000 turkeys were moved to safer areas.

As Camille impacted Cuba, small craft were advised not to venture out too far from the coasts of Florida.

On August 15, the National Hurricane Center issued a hurricane watch for a  stretch of land in Florida, between Apalachicola and Fort Walton Beach. The next day, as these hurricane watches were upgraded to a hurricane warning, thousands of people boarded up their homes and evacuated inland. During the afternoon of August 16, the weather bureau ordered that a hurricane watch should be placed in force for the coastline from Biloxi to St Marks, Florida. Later that day, the hurricane watches were upgraded to a hurricane warning for the northwestern Florida coast, from Fort Walton to St Marks.

By Saturday morning, a hurricane watch was issued for the coast from Biloxi eastward. Civil defense organizations in coastal counties went on alert. Keesler Air Force Base and the Naval Construction Battalion Center prepared for the storm. By 5 p.m. on Sunday, a hurricane warning was issued for the coast. This activated the National Guard units. Many refused to believe the reports concerning Camille's intensity that afternoon. The mayor of Gulfport ordered the release of prisoners from the city jail as winds increased at 9 p.m. on Sunday evening, but none would leave.

Impact

Making landfall in Waveland, Mississippi, as a Category 5 hurricane, Camille caused damage and destruction across much of the Gulf Coast of the United States. Because it moved quickly through the region, Hurricane Camille dropped only moderate precipitation in most areas. The total U.S. estimated cost of damage was $1.42 billion (1969 USD). This made Camille tied (with Hurricane Betsy) as the most expensive hurricane in the United States, up to that point. The storm directly killed 143 people along Alabama, Mississippi, and Louisiana. An additional 153 people perished as a result of catastrophic flooding in Nelson County, Virginia and other areas nearby. In all, 8,931 people were injured, 5,662 homes were destroyed, and 13,915 homes experienced major damage, with many of the fatalities being coastal residents who had refused to evacuate.

Caribbean and Offshore Gulf of Mexico
As a developing tropical storm, Camille brought rain showers to Grand Cayman, although there were no reports of damage. The hurricane produced up to  near Guane, as well as on the Isle of Pines. On the Isle of Pines, the storm inflicted damage to about 100 houses. Throughout Pinar del Río Province, Camille caused heavy damage, primarily from river flooding; about 20,000 people were left homeless in the province. Strong winds downed trees and power lines, which caused power outages eastward through the capital city of Havana. Initially, the government reported no casualties from the storm. Subsequent research indicated the hurricane killed five people in the country during its passage, and damage was estimated at $5 million (1969 USD).

In the days after the storm struck Cuba, the government deployed medical teams to affected regions to provide typhoid vaccine shots. Officials noted the potential for the spread of disease, due to flooding from Camille as well as previously wet conditions.

In the open Gulf of Mexico, the hurricane produced wave heights of at least , as measured by
Shell Oil Company. Along the ocean floor, the storm created mudslides which lowered the ocean floor; its combination with strong waves and winds destroyed three oil platforms, including one that at the time was the deepest oil well. Property damages to the offshore oil industry were initially estimated at $100 million (1969 USD).

Louisiana

Almost total destruction was seen from Venice to Buras. Camille caused about $322 million (1969 dollars) of damage in Louisiana. The storm turned just in time to avoid a direct hit to the City of New Orleans, which was devastated just four years prior by Hurricane Betsy. The worst effects in New Orleans proper were flooding from some levees, particularly in the lowest lying areas, including the Lower Ninth Ward, which suffered the most severe flooding during Betsy.

Mississippi

In Mississippi, Camille was significantly worse than Hurricane Betsy and a September 1947 hurricane. Electricity went out during Camille's approach to the Mississippi coastline. United States Highway 90 flooded as a large storm surge overtopped seawalls, leaving a barge along the highway in Gulfport. Fires consumed coastal communities, with the exceptions of Bay St. Louis and Waveland. Camille destroyed the antebellum Trinity Episcopal church in Pass Christian, taking 15 lives. The Dixie White House, where President Woodrow Wilson and his family once stayed, was badly damaged. In Biloxi, Mississippi, the storm surge reached the second floor of the structure. Mississippi received the worst of the damage. Upon making landfall, Camille produced a  storm surge. Along Mississippi's entire shore and for some three to four blocks inland, the destruction was nearly complete. The worst-hit areas were Clermont Harbor, Lakeshore, Waveland, Bay St. Louis, Pass Christian, Long Beach, and the beachfront of Gulfport, Mississippi City, and Biloxi. One of Frank Lloyd Wright's waterfront houses for W. L. Fuller, in Pass Christian, was completely destroyed.

U.S. Highway 90, which is close to the shore, was broken up in many areas, and sand and debris blocked much of it. Totals say that 3,800 homes and businesses were completely destroyed. As Camille came ashore, it passed over Ship Island, off the coast of Mississippi; Camille's strong storm surge and torrential rains literally split the island in two: the body of water between West Ship Island and East Ship Island is now called "Camille's Cut". Camille had significant ecological effects in the Gulf Coast region. A barrier island chain off the coast of Mississippi and 70% of Dauphin Island were completely inundated by the storm's surge. Camille caused about $950 million (1969 dollars) of damage in Mississippi.

Hurricane Party

One persistent account about Camille states that 24 people held a "hurricane party" on the third floor of the Richelieu Manor Apartments in Pass Christian, Mississippi, in the path of the eyewall as it made landfall. The high storm surge flooded and destroyed the building, killing all but one person. Who the survivor is, how many party guests there were, and just how far away the sole survivor was swept by the storm varies with the recounting.

News footage from Hurricane Camille was used in the 1974 ABC made-for-TV movie titled Hurricane, which also features a plotline based on the Richelieu Manor hurricane party that never happened. Well-known stars in the film included Will Geer and Michael Learned as NWS meteorologists tracking the storm; Larry Hagman and Jessica Walter as a vacationing couple who get caught in the storm on their boat, and are actually drawn into the eye of the hurricane; and Martin Milner as the Air Force Major who flies over the storm and reports their location (so they can be rescued by a Navy submarine). One of the plotlines does feature a group of people holding a hurricane party in the home of Bert Pearson, played by Frank Sutton (best known for playing Sergeant Carter on Gomer Pyle USMC). Only Jim, played by Patrick Duffy, and his wife refuse to join the party. Pearson and his guests turn out the lights and hide when a Highway Patrolman checks whether the building has been entirely evacuated. Afterward, the party resumes and the guests are oblivious to any danger, until the storm strikes, knocking in the wall and causing other major damage. When Pearson awakes the next morning after the storm has passed, he discovers his wife has been killed.

The 1991 episode "Hurricane", of the sci-fi drama series Quantum Leap, also incorporated the apocryphal party into a story set in a town when it is struck by Hurricane Camille.

Twenty-three people are known to have stayed in the Richelieu Manor Apartments during the hurricane, eight of whom died despite taking all precautions they knew in order to secure the building. The tale of the non-existent party, and the lone survivor when there were 15, apparently originated with survivor Mary Ann Gerlach, who also told her story in the NOVA episode Hurricane! (Nova). Another survivor, Ben Duckworth, has expressed irritation at the story. "There was no hurricane party," Duckworth reiterated in 2001. "We were exhausted from boarding up windows and helping the police move cars. We were too tired to party. I can't tell you why that story persists, or why people didn't put two and two together. I guess the hurricane party makes a good story."

The site of the Richelieu Apartments, the corner of Henderson Avenue and U.S. 90 in Pass Christian, later became a shopping center. The shopping center was later destroyed by Hurricane Katrina.

Alabama and Florida
Alabama also experienced damage along U.S. Highway 90: 26,000 homes and over 1,000 businesses were wiped out completely across the state of Alabama. Camille's large circulation also resulted in a  storm surge in Apalachicola, Florida. The highest rainfall report received within Alabama was  two miles northeast of Fairhope. Camille caused about $8 million (1969 dollars) of damage in Alabama.

Ohio Valley and West Virginia

Virginia
Because the hurricane was expected to quickly dissipate over land, few were prepared for the flash flooding. Arriving in Virginia on the evening of August 19, Camille was no longer a hurricane, but it carried high amounts of moisture and contained sufficient strength and low pressure to pull in additional moisture.

A total of 153 people lost their lives from blunt trauma sustained during mountain slides, related to the flash flooding, not drowning. More than 123 of these deaths, including 21 members of one family, the Huffmans, were in Nelson County. Seven victims of the hurricane in Nelson County remain unidentified, as well as one in Albemarle County. Avalanches occurred on hillsides with a slope greater than 35 percent. In Nelson County, the number of deaths amounted to over one percent of the county's population. The worst of the damage was reported in Massies Mill, Woods Mill, Roseland, Bryant, Tyro, Montebello, Lovingston, Norwood, Rockfish, and along the Davis and Muddy creeks. Hurricane Camille caused more than $140 million of damage (1969 dollars) in Virginia. Camille was considered one of the worst natural disasters in central Virginia's recorded history.

Most of the rainfall occurred in Virginia during a 3–5 hour period on August 19–20. More than five inches of rain fell near the North Fork of the Tye River in only half an hour with the grounds already saturated from previous rains. Many rivers in Virginia and West Virginia set records for peak flood stages, causing numerous mudslides along mountainsides. There, rainfall was so heavy that reports were received of birds drowning in trees, cows floating down the Hatt Creek and of survivors having to cup hands around their mouth and nose in order to breathe through the deluge. Though the official rainfall was recorded as 27 inches, unofficial estimates are much greater. Some estimate that more than 40 inches of rain fell at Davis Creek. Most gauges were washed away; however, it was reported that an empty 55-gallon drum that was not even in the center of the heaviest rainfall had 31 inches of water in it after Camille passed. "So much rain fell in such a short time in Nelson County that, according to the National Weather Service at the time, it was 'the probable maximum rainfall which meteorologists compute to be theoretically possible.'"

The ensuing flash floods and mudslides killed 153 people. In Nelson County alone, 133 bridges washed out, while in some places entire communities were under water.

The major flooding that occurred downstream cut off all communication between Richmond and the Shenandoah Valley. Waynesboro on the South River saw eight feet of water downtown, and Buena Vista had more than five feet.

Throughout Virginia, Camille destroyed 313 houses, 71 trailers, and 430 farm buildings. 3,765 families were affected by the hurricane in the area, and total damage in the state amounted to $140.8 million (1969 USD, $747 million 2005 USD).

Records

This was also its landfalling pressure; the only hurricane to hit the United States with a lower pressure at landfall was the Labor Day Hurricane of 1935.

The  storm surge quoted by the Army Corps of Engineers was based on high-water marks inside surviving buildings, of which there were but three. About 15 minutes later, the building collapsed and the evidence vanished with it.

In addition, Camille forced the Mississippi River to flow backwards for a river-distance of 125 miles (from its mouth to a point north of New Orleans). The river further backed up for an additional , to a point north of Baton Rouge.

Aftermath

The response after the storm involved many federal, state, and local agencies and volunteer organizations. The main organization for coordinating the federal response to the disaster was the Office of Emergency Preparedness, which provided $76 million (1969 USD, $403 million 2005 USD) to administer and coordinate disaster relief programs. Food and shelter were available the day after the storm. On August 19, parts of Mississippi and Louisiana were declared major disaster areas and became eligible for federal disaster relief funds. President Richard Nixon ordered 1450 regular troops and 800 United States Army Engineers into the area to bring tons of food, vehicles, and aircraft. Large organizations contributing to the relief effort included the Federal Power Commission, which helped fully return power to affected areas by November 25, 1969. The Coast Guard (then under the Department of Transportation), Air Force, Army, Army Corps of Engineers, Navy Seabees, and Marine Corps all helped with evacuations, search and rescue, clearing debris, and distribution of food. The Department of Defense contributed $34 million (1969 USD, $180 million 2005 USD) and 16,500 military troops overall to the recovery. The Department of Health provided 
$4 million towards medicine, vaccines and other health related needs.

On Monday, the Air National Guard and those at Keesler Air Force Base airlifted patients to Jackson and other more inland locations. Volunteers searched for those injured and dead, as well as helping refugees. When many of the evacuees returned by Tuesday, Governor John Bell Williams declared martial law, blocking highways into the area and leading to a 6 p.m. to 6 a.m. curfew. The governor also opened Camp Shelby, dormitories within the University of Southern Mississippi, and the Robert E. Lee Hotel to serve as shelters for those who lost homes. Sections of Bay St. Louis and Pass Christian were evacuated. Survivors were found for days after the storm, with 35 trapped by high water north of Bay St. Louis rescued on Thursday. Army engineers disposed of 25 tons of dead animals, mostly cows, during the week following Camille. One week after the storm, Keesler-based airplanes sprayed malathion at low altitudes to kill the thriving insect population. Martial law would be lifted on August 27. The federal and state military presence would continue for several weeks. During the evening of September 8, President Nixon visited the Biloxi-Gulfport Regional Airport and gave a speech to elevate the spirits of local residents struggling with the storm's aftermath. During the rebuilding process, stricter building codes were enforced by local governments. In 1973, hurricane hunters and their associated reconnaissance aircraft relocated to Keesler Air Force Base when their previous headquarters at Ramey, Puerto Rico, closed.

Long-term redevelopment was overseen by the Department of Commerce, which contributed $30 million (1969 USD, $159 million 2005 USD) towards planned and coordinated redevelopment of affected areas. NOAA Weather Radio was expanded to coastal locations during the 1970s in the wake of Camille based upon recommendations made by the Department of Commerce in September 1969.

The devastation of Camille inspired the implementation of the Saffir–Simpson scale. After the storm, many Gulf Coast residents commented that hurricane warnings were not clear enough in conveying the expected intensity of the coming storm. The Saffir–Simpson scale offered a much more concise statement of storm intensity than barometric pressure and wind-speed measurements, and veterans of previous hurricanes could analogize the power of the approaching storm to those they had experienced.

In a 1999 report on Hurricane Camille sponsored by the NOAA Coastal Services Center, the authors concluded: "With Camille, the preparations for the event and the response were based on processes put in place long before the storm made landfall. Coordination between government agencies as well as with state and local officials was enhanced because of preexisting plans."

One small compensation was that recovery from flood damage in Nelson County, Virginia led to the discovery of the Ginger Gold apple in the orchards of Clyde Harvey.

Retirement

Due to the major destruction and death in much of the Southern United States, the name Camille was retired after the 1969 season, and will never again be used for an Atlantic or Gulf hurricane or tropical storm. The name Cindy was scheduled to replace the name in 1973, although a new ten-year list of names was created for the 1972–1980 Atlantic hurricane seasons.

Comparisons to Hurricane Katrina

Although Hurricane Camille and Hurricane Katrina took different paths, both reached the same section of the coast of Mississippi with similar destructive effects. Camille intensified more rapidly than Katrina, and unlike Katrina, Camille re-intensified a second time and maintained status as a Category 5 hurricane until landfall. Both hurricanes shared the common aspect of undergoing periods of rapid intensification. The size of Camille's radius of maximum wind was less than one-third that of Katrina, more similar to the intense but small Hurricane Andrew. Also unlike Katrina, Camille caused little damage in New Orleans, Louisiana, though Camille itself just barely missed the city. The area of hurricane-force winds within Camille was just over two-thirds the size of Hurricane Katrina. Both storms were moving at a similar forward motion at the time of landfall. Although Camille's wind speed at landfall was higher, Katrina's storm surge exceeded Camille's storm surge at all known locations due to its greater size. Both hurricanes' names were retired.

Naming issues
In the 1960s, Atlantic hurricane names consisted of women's names which were reused every fourth year. The practice of retiring hurricane names was meant to be temporary, with the guideline that a name be retired for ten years. When the name Carla was retired in 1961 it was replaced on the 1965 list with Carol, a name retired in 1954 when its namesake devastated New England. Since over a decade had passed, Carol was eligible for reuse. Carol entered the 1969 list, but scientists from the National Hurricane Research Laboratory (NHRL) asked the naming committee in January 1969 to permanently retire Carol, Edna, and Hazel since papers were still being written about the storms. The committee agreed but needed a replacement "C" name. John Hope's daughter Camille was involved in an advanced science and math program in high school and had carried out a required independent research project. John Hope asked Banner Miller to mentor her in her investigation of hurricanes and long-term atmospheric trends. Miller was impressed by her project and suggested her name for the list. "We kept it quiet for many years," Camille said in a phone interview circa 2014.

In popular culture

Films 
  A Lady Called Camille (1971), created by the U.S. Department of Agriculture shortly after the hurricane, shows preparation and recovery efforts organized largely by Wade Guice, the former Harrison County Civil Defense Director whose wife, Julia, served as Biloxi Civil Defense Director at the time. The couple are seen at their posts at the outset of the film. The film also contains brief footage of the ill-fated Richilieu Apartments after the hurricane, where a Civil Defense worker had attempted to persuade residents to evacuate. The film is accessible in the Internet Archive FedFlix collection.
 
 Frank Sutton (well known as Sergeant Carter in the Gomer Pyle, USMC TV series) and Larry Hagman starred in the disaster movie Hurricane (TV 1974), based on Hurricane Camille. It contained references to the Richilieu Apartments and the Hurricane Hunter plane that flew into the eye of Camille and lost an engine.

Music
 Jazz Banjo player Béla Fleck wrote a jazz fusion song "Hurricane Camille" on his album Béla Fleck and the Flecktones (1991).

Publications
 Tom Clancy's novel Without Remorse (1993) opens with the demolition of an oil rig damaged during Camille.

Stage productions
 Beth Henley's play Crimes of the Heart (1979) takes place in Hazlehurst, Mississippi and is set five years after Hurricane Camille. While the hurricane is rarely mentioned in the script, it is cited as the cause of Doc Porter's limp and the reason Meg Magrath has been shunned by most of the town. The play was originally produced by the Actors Theatre of Louisville, Inc. in February 1979 and received its New York premiere at the Manhattan Theatre Club in 1980.
 In 2008, Lynchburg, Virginia-based Endstation Theatre Company (then based in Amherst, Virginia) premiered an original play, The Bluest Water: A Hurricane Camille Story (by playwright Jason Chimonides), as part of its inaugural Blue Ridge Summer Theatre Festival on the campus of Sweet Briar College. While the play was partly historical fiction (featuring contrived characters experiencing or remembering the actual events of Hurricane Camille), many characters' stories or lines of dialogue were composites of true accounts or testimonials from Nelson County (most notably Massies Mill, the Tye River, and Davis Creek) and the surrounding areas. The play was revived in the festival's second year (2009), in conjunction with the Nelson County Historical Society's observation of the 40th anniversary of Camille.

Television
 In the October 2, 1991, episode of the NBC series Quantum Leap, titled "Hurricane" (Season 4, Episode 3), the main character, Sam Beckett, leaps into Archie Necaise, a small-town sheriff in the middle of Hurricane Camille. He must keep his host's girlfriend from being killed in the storm. Hurricane Camille is the backdrop of the story.
 In the 1978 documentary series When Havoc Struck presented by Glenn Ford, one episode was titled 'Hurricane Camille'.

See also

List of Atlantic hurricane records
List of Category 5 Atlantic hurricanes
List of wettest known tropical cyclones in Virginia
List of retired Atlantic hurricane names
Hurricane Katrina (2005) – Another Category 5 hurricane that devastated similar areas, becoming the costliest tropical cyclone worldwide
Hurricane Michael (2018) – Another Category 5 hurricane that struck the Gulf Coast of the United States

References

Further reading

Historical Hurricanes

External links

Face to Face with Hurricane Camille, Joseph P. Blank, Reader's Digest (March 1970), pp 62–67
Harrison County Library's Camille Page
Post-Storm Report on Camille
Radar image of Camille
Storm surge profile
The story of Harbour Oaks Inn
Thirty Years After Hurricane Camille: Lessons Learned, Lessons Lost, Roger A. Pielke Jr., Chantal Simonpietri, and Jennifer Oxelson, July 12, 1999.
Track of Camille's eye at landfall

1969 natural disasters
Camille
Camille
Camille
Camille
Camille
Camille
Camille
1969 natural disasters in the United States
Camille
Camille